Not Cool is a 2014 American romantic teen comedy film directed and edited by Shane Dawson (in his feature directorial debut), written by Dan Schoffer, and produced by Lauren Schnipper, Dawson, and Josh Shader. The film centers on a group of high school friends reuniting over their Thanksgiving break during college. Along with Hollidaysburg, it is one of two films that were produced for the Starz reality competition show The Chair, where the competitors use the same screenplay to create their own film. The film stars Cherami Leigh, Shane Dawson, Drew Monson, Michelle Veintimilla, Lisa Schwartz, and Bill Laing. The film grossed $36,026 in the US against an $800,000 budget and received negative reviews. As of 2021, it is Dawson's only directed feature film.

Plot
In a small Pennsylvania town, a group of high school friends reunite during a Thanksgiving break from their college classes. Former prom king Scott (Shane Dawson) is dumped by his hyperactive, erratic girlfriend Heather (Jorie Kosel) and finds a new love interest in Tori (Cherami Leigh). Meanwhile, Scott's younger sister Janié (Michelle Veintimilla) is approached by Joel (Drew Monson), who tries to woo her using the knowledge he gained from her social media posts.

Cast
 Cherami Leigh as Tori, is an 18-year-old girl who is the main character and narrator. She is known to be downbeat and suicidal, but then falls for her old bully, Scott, who has changed since high school.
 Shane Dawson as Scott, an 18-year-old, who starts to develop feelings for one of his old high school victims after he notices she has changed.
 Drew Monson as Joel, is an 18-year-old nerdy "player" who has feelings for Scott's younger sister Janie.
 Michelle Veintimilla as Janie, is a 17-year-old popular girl and Scott's younger sister who looks all put together on the outside, but is lonely on the inside.
 Lisa Schwartz as Marisa, Tori's successful, blind 22-year-old sister, who is marrying Gil, who Tori considers a "freak show/nutjob."
 Bill Laing as Ray, Scott and Janie's father, who is selling his store that Scott and Janie love and Joel works at, so he can be with a woman named Anastasia.
 Jorie Kosel as Heather, is Scott's erratic and hyper ex-girlfriend who is obsessed with sex and anything that involves sex. She forces herself on Scott at a party, humiliating Tori when she walks in on them.

Production
Not Cool, along with Anna Martemucci's Hollidaysburg, is one of two films sponsored by the Starz reality competition show The Chair. The films vied for a $250,000 prize based on multi-platform voting system. The film cost $800,000 and took 20 days to shoot.

Release
The film was released through Starz Digital Media theatrically on September 19, 2014.

The film was released digitally on September 23, 2014.

Reception
On Rotten Tomatoes the film has an approval rating of 14% based on seven reviews and an average rating of 2.1/10. On Metacritic, the film has a weighted average score of one based on four reviews, indicating "overwhelming dislike". This puts the film among the lowest rated films on Metacritic.

Frank Schreck of The Hollywood Reporter wrote, "Filled with ethnic stereotypes, scatological humor, profane language and characters who are not so much caricatures as cartoons, Not Cool well lives up to its title." Neil Genzlinger of The New York Times wrote that the "characters are vile; the acting is terrible (Mr. Dawson, who has had some YouTube success, cast himself in a leading role); the tone is a confusing mishmash; and there’s not an original thought or joke in the thing." The Los Angeles Times called the film "an abyss, an insult to the craft of filmmaking, storytelling and entertainment in almost every way."

On the final episode of The Chair, broadcast on November 8, 2014, it was revealed that Dawson's film won the prize. The results were tabulated with SurveyMonkey, where Not Cool averaged 63 out of 100 in comparison to Martemucci's film which averaged 58. In total, 39% of the votes cast were disqualified for lack of evidence that the voter viewed both films. Chris Moore, executive producer of The Chair, noted that Dawson's film was mainstream. The Chair producer Zachary Quinto called Dawson's film "ultimately a vapid waste of time," but was "glad Shane won — he set out to do what he wanted to do."

In 2020 amid accusations of harmful jokes in his videos, Dawson released an apology video and mentioned the film (albeit not by name). Dawson stated his personal problems carried over onto production, and became hostile to those on set who criticized his style of humor and on set antics. In retaliation, Dawson admitted to then purposefully making the film even more over the top as a way to "say' Screw you, I'm gonna make it even crazier.'" Dawson expressed regret over the film, saying it's hard for him to watch the film now and "I would never make a movie like that now."

References

External links
 
 
 
 
 

2010s sex comedy films
2014 comedy films
2014 directorial debut films
2014 films
American independent films
American romantic comedy films
American sex comedy films
American teen films
American teen comedy films
2010s English-language films
Films set in Pittsburgh
Films shot in Pennsylvania
Point Park University
Shane Dawson
Starz Entertainment Group
Films about social media
Thanksgiving in films
2010s American films